Post Amazers is an animation and post-production facility that provides creative services from concept to execution including art direction, broadcast design, 2D/3D animation, post-production, sound design etc.

Their work consists of Son of the Mask, Exorcist: The Beginning, Adventures of Zak & Sylvia (animated serial pilot for Black Cherry Multimedia; Canada), Just Imagine (animated film for Quartics, USA), Commander Safeguard (animated films for Pakistan (until 2016), Mexico & China) and more than 1000 commercials.

See also
List of animation studios

Animation studios